The Freedom Riders National Monument is a United States National Monument in Anniston, Alabama established by President Barack Obama in January 2017 to preserve and commemorate the Freedom Riders during the Civil Rights Movement. The monument is administered by the National Park Service. The Freedom Riders National Monument is one of three National Monuments that was designated by presidential proclamation of President Obama on January 12, 2017. The second was the Birmingham Civil Rights National Monument and the third, the Reconstruction Era National Historical Park, was re-designated as a National Historical Park on March 12, 2019.

Sites
 
The Freedom Riders National Monument comprises two locations, one in downtown Anniston itself and the other outside town.

Greyhound Bus Station
The first site designated as part of the national monument is the former Greyhound bus depot at 1031 Gurnee Avenue in Anniston, where, on May 14, 1961, a mob attacked an integrated group of white and black Freedom Riders who demanded an end to racial segregation in interstate busing. The mob slashed the bus's tires, threw rocks, broke the bus's windows, and pursued the bus after it pulled away from the depot. Today the wall of the building adjacent to the former depot features a mural and educational panels describing the incident; a similar mural has been installed adjacent to the former Trailways station where the other Freedom Riders arrived in 1961. The former Greyhound station was later owned by the City of Anniston prior to its donation to the United States government. It is one of nine sites that are part of the Anniston Civil Rights and Heritage Trail, and is commemorated with a historic marker, erected in 2016.

The National Park Service, in conjunction with the city of Anniston, has announced plans to develop the building and open it to the public, but as of May 2017 it was closed to visitors.

Site of bus burning

It was at this spot that the bus broke down because of its flat tires. The segregationist mob, which had followed it from the bus depot, continued its assault, throwing "a bundle of flaming rags into the bus that exploded seconds later" which set the vehicle ablaze. The mob attacked the passengers as they tried to flee. Freelance photographer Joseph "Little Joe" Postiglione photographed the bus as it burned; the resulting image has become an icon of the civil rights movement. An Alabama Historical Marker, erected in 2007 under the auspices of the Theta Tau chapter of Omega Psi Phi fraternity, marks the site of the bus burning.

It was announced in 2010 that five acres of land surrounding the site of the bus burning had been donated to Calhoun County for the development of a memorial park; initial plans called for a landscaped walkway, with interpretive plaques to be erected at the site. Possible future features include a statue of Hank Thomas, a survivor of the incident, being given water by nearby resident Janie Forsythe. Since designation of the national monument, the National Park Service, Calhoun County, and the Freedom Riders Memorial Committee have begun working together to develop a plan for interpreting the site; Alabama Power provided money for the effort in 2015. A sign denoting the future presence of the park was erected in 2012. Soon after it was placed at the site it was vandalized, but repairs were quickly made.

The site of the burning is today surrounded by private residences.

History of the monument
Designation of the national monument followed a visit by Interior Secretary Sally Jewell and National Park Service Director Jonathan Jarvis to the site in October 2016. The designation of the National Monument was hailed by local leaders in Anniston and Calhoun County, who had actively campaigned for the monument's creation. Others who supported its establishment included Senator Richard Shelby; Representative Mike Rogers, who had introduced a bill to designate Freedom Riders National Historical Park in July 2016; and governor Robert J. Bentley.

A dedication ceremony took place on May 13, 2017, in downtown Anniston, on the day before the 56th anniversary of the incident; some members of the audience had traveled from as far away as Denmark. Former Freedom Rider Hank Thomas, the last living survivor of the bus-burning incident, delivered a speech. An interim visitor center, including a station where visitors may procure a National Parks passport stamp, has been established in the reception area of Anniston City Hall.

In 2017, the National Park Service sought input from the public on planning and interpreting the National Monument. Federal and local officials began drafting formal plans for its management late in 2017. In March 2018, the Anniston City Council commissioned Jacksonville State University to conduct an economic impact study for the monument.

The Freedom Riders National Monument is a feature landmark of the United States Civil Rights Trail.

See also
 Birmingham Civil Rights National Monument
 Medgar and Myrlie Evers Home National Monument
 Civil rights movement in popular culture
 National Register of Historic Places listings in Calhoun County, Alabama
 List of national monuments of the United States

References

External links
Official National Park Service site

2017 establishments in Alabama
Monuments and memorials of the civil rights movement
Anniston, Alabama
Freedom Riders
National Monuments in Alabama
National Monuments designated by Barack Obama
Protected areas established in 2017
Protected areas of Calhoun County, Alabama